Mersin İdmanyurdu (also Mersin İdman Yurdu, Mersin İY, or MİY) Sports Club; located in Mersin, east Mediterranean coast of Turkey in 2014–15. Mersin İdmanyurdu football team in 2014–15 season in Turkish Süper Lig. 2014–15 season was the 14th season of Mersin İdmanyurdu football team in Süper Lig, the top level division in Turkey. Mersin İdmanyurdu football team has finished 2014–15 season in 7th place in Turkish Süper Lig and remained in the league. Team participated in 2014–15 Turkish Cup and was eliminated at quarterfinals.

Ali Kahramanlı was club president. Rıza Çalımbay was head coach. Attacking midfielder Güven Varol and defensive midfielder Murat Ceylan were the most appeared players with 39 appearances in total. Captain and centre back Servet Çetin was most appeared player in league matches with 33 appearances. Welliton was the top goalscorer with 13 goals.

2014–15 Süper Lig participation
Süper Lig was played as "Spor-Toto Süper Lig" for Spor-Toto, a publicly owned betting institution, was sponsor for the season. The name of the season was inscribed as "Süleyman Seba Season" in memory of Beşiktaş's former president Süleyman Seba. 18 teams attended. MİY was one of the new entrants along with Balıkesirspor and İstanbul Büyükşehir Belediyespor who changed their names as İstanbul Başakşehir F.K. before the start of the season. Champions was eligible for 2015–16 UEFA Champions League in Group stage. Runners-up were eligible for Champions League 3rd qualifying round. Third and fourth placed teams were eligible for 2015–16 UEFA Europa League at 3rd and 2nd qualifying rounds respectively. Starting from this season 5th team in the league table was eligible for Europa League if the cup winner was among in first four placed teams. If otherwise, winner of 2014–15 Turkish Cup was eligible for Europa League at group stage. Bottom three teams were relegated to 2015–16 TFF First League.

Results summary
Mersin İdmanyurdu (MİY) 2014–15 Süper Lig season league summary:

Sources: 2014–15 Spor-Toto Süper Lig pages.

League table
Mersin İdmanyurdu (MİY) 2014–15 Süper Lig season place in league table.

Results by round
Results of games MİY played in 2014–15 Süper Lig by rounds:

First half
Mersin İdmanyurdu (MİY) 2014–15 Süper Lig season first half game reports is shown in the following table.
Kick off times are in EET and EEST.

Sources: 2014–15 Süper Lig pages.

Second half
Mersin İdmanyurdu (MİY) 2014–15 Süper Lig season second half game reports is shown in the following table.
Kick off times are in EET and EEST.

Sources: 2014–15 Süper Lig pages.

2014–15 Turkish Cup participation
2014–15 Turkish Cup was played for 53rd time as Ziraat Türkiye Kupası for sponsorship reasons. The Cup was played by 156 teams in four stages. In the first stage 1 preliminary and 3 elimination rounds were played in one-leg elimination system. In the second stage 16 teams played in eight groups (A to H) in a two-leg round-robin system. In the third stage, first and second ranked teams in each group played 1/8 games in one-leg elimination system at first ranked team's home. In the fourth stage quarterfinals and semifinals were played in two-leg elimination system, second games being played at higher ranked team's home. Final was played in one game system in a neutral venue.  Mersin İdmanyurdu took place in the Cup starting from second elimination round and promoted to group stage. MİY took place in Group C and finished second. In the third stage MİY was paired with Karabükspor and promoted after extra time. In quarterfinals, Fenerbahçe was drawn as opponents, second game being played in opponents' grounds. MİY was eliminated by Fenerbahçe who was eliminated by Bursaspor at semifinals. Galatasaray won the Cup for 16th time.

Cup track
The drawings and results Mersin İdmanyurdu (MİY) followed in 2014–15 Turkish Cup are shown in the following table.

Note: In the above table 'Score' shows For and Against goals whether the match played at home or not.

Game details
Mersin İdmanyurdu (MİY) 2014–15 Turkish Cup game reports is shown in the following table.
Kick off times are in EET and EEST.

Source: 2014–15 Turkish Cup (Ziraat Türkiye Kupası) official TFF page. Attendance for quarterfinals from ntvspor.

Management
President Ali Kahramanlı continued in his position which he held in 2008. Club address was: Palmiye Mah. Adnan Menders Bl. 1204 Sk. Onur Ap. K.2 D.3 Yenişehir/Mersin.

Club management
The incumbent board of management was elected on 27 October 2014. The division of labor in the board was as follows (as of January 2015): Ali Kahrahramanlı (President), Senan İdin (Deputy President), Beşir Acar General Secretary), Sedat Aydöner (financial and juridical affairs), Hikmet Kaya and Ahmet Turan Serttaş (football division and spokesmen), Apti Öztürk and Şerafettin Kadooğlu (amateur divisions), Sabri Tekli and Ufuk Maya (financial resources and ethics), Ayhan Erdem and Metin Yıldıran (facilities and institutionalization).
The administrative staff were as follows: Mesut Bilir (General Coordinator), Murat Öğ (General Director), Duygu Bilir (Accreditation), Özcan Ulusoy (accounting), Rıfkı Çınar and Barış Köksal (public relations), Mustafa Kaya (security), Ökkeş Aybar (transportation).

Coaching team
Since 3 June 2014 Rıza Çalımbay has been the Technical Director (meaning "head coach" in Turkey). Other technical staff includes: Kerem Atılmaz (Administrative Director), Bülent Albayrak, Kenan Oktay and Ayhan Tenbeloğolu (Trainers), M. Cengiz Birgen (Goalkeeper Trainer), Burhan Kılıç (Statisticial Analyzer), Serkan Damla (General Manager), Ahmet Edremit (Physician), Serkan Sağlık (Physiotherapist), Ersoy Şenel, Oktay Baş and Abdülkadir Topal (Masseurs), Abdülkadir Reşiti and Caner Çakmak (Translators).

Note: Only official games were included.

2014–15 squad
Appearances, goals and cards count for 2014–15 Süper Lig and Türkiye Kupası (2014–15 Turkish Cup) games. Only the players who appeared in game rosters were included. Player's are listed in order of appearance. MİY could not signed with new players in the mid-season, because FIFA decided on two season transfer ban for MİY due to termination of the contract of the MİY's former player David Bičík. The ban was applied for 2015 Winter and Summer transfer seasons.

Sources: TFF club page and maçkolik team page.

U-21 and U-19 teams

Mersin İdmanyurdu U-21 team participated in U21 League Süper Lig and U19 team in Elite U19 League.

See also
 Football in Turkey
 2014–15 Süper Lig
 2014–15 Turkish Cup

Notes and references

2014-15
Turkish football clubs 2014–15 season